Helmut Petri (7 November 1907 – 21 June 1986) was a German anthropologist.

Life
Petri was born in Cologne and received his early education both there and in Berlin. He began his university studies in 1928, taking in Economics, History and Philosophy, as well as coursework on Prehistory and Physical Anthropology, with studies that took him also to Rome, and Vienna where he studied under Wilhelm Schmidt. Wilhelm Koppers and Robert von Heine-Geldern were also among his teachers there. In this early phase Petri was particularly taken by Meso-American cultures, studying under the direction of Fritz Röck, and learnt Nahuatl. He completed his PhD with a thesis on currencies in the South Pacific (Geldformen der Südsee ).

His first professional appointment was in Vienna, where he was curator at both the Museum of Ethnology and the Museum of Natural History  In 1935 he moved to Frankfurt am Main to take up a position with the Frobenius Institute. Frankfurt provided him with the opportunity to pursue research on Oceania and Australia at the Museum of World Cultures and, in 1938-1939, he embarked on his first piece of ethnographical fieldwork, which took him to the Kimberley region of Western Australia. There he worked in particular with the Worrorra, Ngarinjin and other tribes of the Dampier Archipelago.

On his return, Petri was drafted into the Wehrmacht and served as a radio-operator in France, Greece, North Africa and Italy. At war's end, he was taken prisoner and detained for several months in an American camp for POWs. On his release, he resumed his former job at the Frobenius Institute, under Adolf Ellegard Jensen, lecturing in anthropology. After a further stint of fieldwork in Australia in 1953-1954. he was appointed to a full professorship in 1956, and department chair of the Department of Social and Cultural Anthropology at the University of Cologne two years later. In 1959 he married a fellow ethnologist, Gisela Odermann,  who had also accompanied him on his fieldwork expedition in 1953/1954. He retired in 1971.

Petri died in Cologne, after 6 weeks in an intensive care unit, after being hospitalized following a car accident in May 1986.

Notes and references

Notes

Sources

1907 births
1986 deaths
German anthropologists
20th-century anthropologists
German Army soldiers of World War II
German prisoners of war in World War II held by the United States